is the fifth single by Japanese singer Angela Aki. It was released on March 7, 2007, and revealed for the first time in her one-man live at Nippon Budokan in December 2006. The song reflects her missing Japan while she was studying in Washington DC. The single is released in CD+DVD (first press only edition) and CD-only (standard edition) formats. It sold 29,948 copies in its first week.

Track listing

Charts

External links
Official Discography 

2007 singles
Angela Aki songs
Japanese-language songs
Song recordings produced by Seiji Kameda
2007 songs
Songs written by Angela Aki